Vasyl Virastyuk (born 22 April 1974), is a Ukrainian politician and former strongman competitor. He is a brother of Roman Virastyuk. Virastyuk was the winner of World's Strongest Man 2004. In a 28 March 2021 parliamentary by-election, Virastyuk was a candidate for Servant of the People. On 15 June 2021, he was sworn in as a member of the Ukrainian parliament.

Career

Sport Career
Vasyl Virastyuk competed in the finals of the World's Strongest Man contest in 2003 and 2004. He finished third in 2003, behind then-defending champion Mariusz Pudzianowski and runner-up Žydrūnas Savickas. The following year, Virastyuk won the 2004 World's Strongest Man title, placing ahead of Savickas and Pudzianowski (Pudzianowski would later be disqualified for testing positive for a banned substance).

After this victory, there was a split in the world of Strongman competition. While some of the competitors such as Virastyuk and Žydrūnas Savickas started competing for the IFSA Strongman title (with Savickas winning the title in 2005 and 2006), others such as Pudzianowski remained and competed for the Met-Rx World's Strongest Man title (with Pudzianowski winning in 2005, 2007, and 2008).

After finishing second in 2005 and third in 2006, at the 2007 IFSA World Championship in Geumsan, South Korea, Virastyuk defeated two-time IFSA World Champion Savickas. With this victory, he became the first athlete in the history of strongman to win both a World's Strongest Man title and an IFSA World title. Savickas would be the second to accomplish this feat after winning the 2009 World's Strongest Man title in Malta.

Virastyuk has also achieved a podium finish on three occasions in three consecutive years (2005, 2006 and 2007) at the Arnold Strongman Classic coming second on each occasion to Žydrūnas Savickas. At the 2008 Arnold Strongman Classic, Virastyuk was forced to withdraw due to injuries, and finished in tenth place with only 8.5 points.

Political career
On 11 February 2021, Virastyuk was nominated to run in the 28 March 2021 parliamentary by-election for constituency 87, located in Ivano-Frankivsk Oblast, by Servant of the People.

On 22 April 2021, the Central Election Commission of Ukraine (CEC) officially declared Virastyuk the winner of the election with 31.25%. Runner up Oleksandr Shevchenko officially received 749 votes less (gaining 29.69% of vote). Shevchenko appealed this decision and on 2 May 2021, the Supreme Court of Ukraine revoked the April 22 CEC  decision claiming the CEC had not ensured the verification of all violations committed during the election. On 19 May 2021, the CEC drew up a new protocol on the results of the election; this time, they declared the results of 6 polling stations invalid. According to this document, Virastyuk had gained 14,811 votes, Shevchenko 13,942 and Ruslan Koshulynskyi 13,463. On 23 May 2021, the Supreme Court annulled this protocol too after an appeal by Shevchenko. The Grand Chamber of the Supreme Court annulled this decision on 5 June 2021 and ten days later he took the oath of the People's Deputy of Ukraine.

Honours
 3rd place World's Strongest Man (2003)
 1st place World's Strongest Man (2004)
 2nd place World Championship (IFSA) (2005)
 3rd place World Championship (IFSA) (2006)
 1st place World Championship (IFSA) (2007)

Filmography
 2009 – How Cossacks... - The Blacksmith
 2013 – Strong Ivan - Velet
 2014 – Lonely under the Сontract - Edik
 2016 – The Dragon Spell - Kyrylo Kozhumiaka
 2018 – The Stolen Princess - Troyeschyna gangster
 2018 – The Adventures of S Nicholas - Kaban
 2019 – Edelweiss Hotel - Police captain
 2019 – Polina and the Mystery of a Film Studio - The Viking

See also
 Strongman Champions League
 IFSA
 Alexey Vishnitsky
 Ukrainian Federation of Strength Athletes

References

1974 births
Living people
Sportspeople from Ivano-Frankivsk
Ukrainian strength athletes
Interregional Academy of Personnel Management alumni
Servant of the People (political party) politicians
Ninth convocation members of the Verkhovna Rada
Ukrainian sportsperson-politicians